Muuto is a Scandinavian design company based in Copenhagen, Denmark. The product range includes furniture and other design products.

History
Muuto was founded by Kristian Byrge and Peter Bonnen in 2006. Byrge had previously been involved in the foundation of Noma. In August 2014, Maj Invest Equity acquired a 45% share of the company. In December 2017, it was announced that Knoll had acquired Muuto with effect from January 2018 for US$300 million.

Products
Muuto collaborates with leading Scandinavian designers who are paid through royalties. The products are sold through 1,300 distributors in 52 countries (2014).

Muuto Talent Award
Since 2010 Muuto has hosted an annual talent award for Nordic student.
2012 winners
1st prize: David Geckeler (Royal Danish Design School) for Nerd Chair
 2nd prize: Caroline Olsson (Akershus University) for Bambi Table
 3rd prize: Marte Straalberg (Bergen National Academy of the Arts) for Sprinkle Lamp

See also
 Scandinavian design

References

External links
 Official website

Furniture companies of Denmark
Design companies established in 2006
Danish companies established in 2006
Design companies based in Copenhagen
Companies based in Copenhagen Municipality
Danish brands